Eva Calvo Gómez (born 29 July 1991) is a Spanish taekwondo practitioner who competes in the 57 kg division. She was the European champion in 2014 and won silver medals at the 2015 World Championships and 2016 Olympics. In 2015, she was named Best Female Athlete of the Year by the Spanish National Taekwondo Federation.

Calvo first trained in athletics and took up taekwondo in 2006, aged 15. Her younger sister Marta Calvo also competes internationally, but in the heavier 62 kg division. Calvo studies computer engineering and mathematics at the Autonomous University of Madrid.

References

External links

1991 births
Living people
Spanish female taekwondo practitioners
Olympic taekwondo practitioners of Spain
Taekwondo practitioners at the 2016 Summer Olympics
Medalists at the 2016 Summer Olympics
Olympic silver medalists for Spain
Olympic medalists in taekwondo
People from Leganés
Sportspeople from the Community of Madrid
Universiade medalists in taekwondo
Mediterranean Games gold medalists for Spain
Mediterranean Games medalists in taekwondo
Competitors at the 2013 Mediterranean Games
Universiade silver medalists for Spain
Taekwondo practitioners at the 2015 European Games
European Games medalists in taekwondo
European Games bronze medalists for Spain
World Taekwondo Championships medalists
European Taekwondo Championships medalists
Medalists at the 2011 Summer Universiade
21st-century Spanish women